This is a list of the mammal species recorded in Taiwan. There are 122 mammal species in Taiwan, of which five are endangered, eight are vulnerable and two are near threatened.

The following tags are used to highlight each species' conservation status as assessed by the International Union for Conservation of Nature:

Order: Primates 

The order Primates contains humans and their closest relatives: lemurs, lorisoids, monkeys, and apes.

Suborder: Haplorhini
Infraorder: Simiiformes
Parvorder: Catarrhini
Superfamily: Cercopithecoidea
Family: Cercopithecidae (Old World monkeys)
Genus: Macaca
 Formosan rock macaque, M. cyclopis

Order: Rodentia (rodents) 

Rodents make up the largest order of mammals, with over 40% of mammalian species. They have two incisors in the upper and lower jaw which grow continually and must be kept short by gnawing.

Suborder: Sciurognathi
Family: Sciuridae (squirrels)
Subfamily: Sciurinae
Tribe: Pteromyini
Genus: Belomys
 Hairy-footed flying squirrel, Belomys pearsonii 
Genus: Petaurista
 Red and white giant flying squirrel, Petaurista alborufus 
 Indian giant flying squirrel, Petaurista philippensis 
Subfamily: Callosciurinae
Genus: Callosciurus
 Pallas's squirrel, Callosciurus erythraeus 
Genus: Dremomys
 Perny's long-nosed squirrel, Dremomys pernyi 
Genus: Tamiops
 Maritime striped squirrel, Tamiops maritimus 
Family: Cricetidae
Subfamily: Arvicolinae
Genus: Eothenomys
 Père David's vole, Eothenomys melanogaster 
Genus: Volemys
 Taiwan vole, Volemys kikuchii VU
Family: Muridae (mice, rats, voles, gerbils, hamsters, etc.)
Subfamily: Murinae
Genus: Apodemus
 Striped field mouse, Apodemus agrarius 
 Taiwan field mouse, Apodemus semotus 
Genus: Bandicota
 Greater bandicoot rat, Bandicota indica 
Genus: Micromys
 Harvest mouse, Micromys minutus 
Genus: Mus
 Ryukyu mouse, Mus caroli 
Genus: Niviventer
 Coxing's white-bellied rat, Niviventer coxingi 
 Oldfield white-bellied rat, Niviventer culturatus 
Genus: Rattus
 Lesser ricefield rat, Rattus losea 
 Tanezumi rat, Rattus tanezumi 
 Brown rat, Rattus norvegicus LC

Order: Lagomorpha (lagomorphs) 

The lagomorphs comprise two families, Leporidae (hares and rabbits), and Ochotonidae (pikas). Though they can resemble rodents, and were classified as a superfamily in that order until the early 20th century, they have since been considered a separate order. They differ from rodents in a number of physical characteristics, such as having four incisors in the upper jaw rather than two.

Family: Leporidae (rabbits, hares)
Genus: Lepus
 Chinese hare, Lepus sinensis

Order: Soricomorpha (shrews, moles, and solenodons) 

The soricomorphs are insectivorous mammals. The shrews and solenodons closely resemble mice while the moles are stout-bodied burrowers.

Family: Soricidae (shrews)
Subfamily: Crocidurinae
Genus: Crocidura
 Asian gray shrew, Crocidura attenuata 
 Taiwanese gray shrew, Crocidura tanakae 
 Gueldenstaedt's shrew, Crocidura gueldenstaedtii 
 Horsfield's shrew, Crocidura horsfieldii 
 Asian lesser white-toothed shrew, Crocidura shantungensis 
Genus: Suncus
 Asian house shrew, Suncus murinus 
Subfamily: Soricinae
Tribe: Anourosoricini
Genus: Anourosorex
Taiwanese mole shrew, Anourosorex yamashinai 
Tribe: Nectogalini
Genus: Chimarrogale
 Himalayan water shrew, Chimarrogale himalayica 
Genus: Soriculus
 Taiwanese brown-toothed shrew, Soriculus fumidus 
Family: Talpidae (moles)
Subfamily: Talpinae
Tribe: Talpini
Genus: Mogera
 Insular mole, Mogera insularis 
Kano's mole, Mogera kanoana NE
 Senkaku mole, Mogera uchidai

Order: Chiroptera (bats) 

The bats' most distinguishing feature is that their forelimbs are developed as wings, making them the only mammals capable of flight. Bat species account for about 20% of all mammals.

Family: Pteropodidae (flying foxes, Old World fruit bats)
Subfamily: Pteropodinae
Genus: Pteropus
 Ryukyu flying fox, Pteropus dasymallus EN
Family: Vespertilionidae
Subfamily: Myotinae
Genus: Myotis
 Large-footed bat, Myotis adversus 
Fringed long-footed myotis, Myotis fimbriatus 
 Hodgson's bat, Myotis formosus 
Fraternal myotis, Myotis frater 
Long-toed myotis, Myotis secundus 
Reddish myotis, Myotis soror DD
Subfamily: Vespertilioninae
Genus: Eptesicus
 Serotine bat, Eptesicus serotinus 
Oriental serotine, Eptesicus pachyomus 
Genus: Nyctalus
 Common noctule, Nyctalus noctula 
Genus: Plecotus
 Taiwan big-eared bat, Plecotus taivanus 
Genus: Scotophilus
 Lesser Asiatic yellow bat, Scotophilus kuhlii 
Genus: Thainycteris
 Necklace pipistrelle, Thainycteris torquatus DD
Genus: Vespertilio
 Asian parti-colored bat, Vespertilio superans 
Subfamily: Murininae
Genus: Harpiocephalus
 Hairy-winged bat, Harpiocephalus harpia 
Genus: Murina
 Bicolored tube-nosed bat, Murina bicolor 
Slender tube-nosed bat, Murina gracilis 
Taiwan tube-nosed bat, Murina puta 
Faint-colored tube-nosed bat, Murina recondita 
Subfamily: Miniopterinae
Genus: Miniopterus
 Schreibers' long-fingered bat, Miniopterus schreibersii 
Family: Molossidae
Genus: Tadarida
 European free-tailed bat, Tadarida teniotis 
Family: Rhinolophidae
Subfamily: Rhinolophinae
Genus: Rhinolophus
 Formosan lesser horseshoe bat, Rhinolophus monoceros 
Subfamily: Hipposiderinae
Genus: Coelops
 East Asian tailless leaf-nosed bat, Coelops frithii 
Genus: Hipposideros
 Great roundleaf bat, Hipposideros armiger

Order: Pholidota (pangolins) 

The order Pholidota comprises the eight species of pangolin. Pangolins are anteaters and have the powerful claws, elongated snout and long tongue seen in the other unrelated anteater species.

Family: Manidae
Genus: Manis
 Chinese pangolin, M. pentadactyla

Order: Cetacea (whales) 

The order Cetacea includes whales, dolphins and porpoises. They are the mammals most fully adapted to aquatic life with a spindle-shaped nearly hairless body, protected by a thick layer of blubber, and forelimbs and tail modified to provide propulsion underwater.

Suborder: Mysticeti
Family: Balaenidae
Genus: Eubalaena
 North Pacific right whale, Eubalaena japonica CR
Family: Balaenopteridae
Subfamily: Megapterinae
Genus: Megaptera
 Northern humpback whale, Megaptera novaeangliae VU
Subfamily: Balaenopterinae
Genus: Balaenoptera
 Common minke whale, Balaenoptera acutorostrata (Coastal Asia) EN
 Northern sei whale, Balaenoptera borealis (Coastal Asia) CR
 Eden's whale, Balaenoptera edeni (East China Sea) LC
 Blue whale, Balaenoptera musculus 
 Northern blue whale, B. m. musculus (Coastal Asia) CR
 Omura's whale, Balaenoptera omurai DD
 Fin whale, Balaenoptera physalus
 Northern fin whale, B. p. physalus (Coastal Asia) CR
Suborder: Odontoceti
Superfamily: Platanistoidea
Family: Phocoenidae
Genus: Neophocaena (finless porpoise)
 Finless porpoise, Neophocaena phocaenoides VU 
Family: Ziphidae
Genus: Ziphius
 Cuvier's beaked whale, Ziphius cavirostris DD
Subfamily: Hyperoodontinae
Genus: Indopacetus
 Tropical bottlenose whale, Indopacetus pacificus DD
Genus: Mesoplodon
 Blainville's beaked whale, Mesoplodon densirostris DD
 Ginkgo-toothed beaked whale, Mesoplodon ginkgodens DD
Family: Delphinidae (marine dolphins)
Genus: Sousa
 Chinese white dolphin, Sousa chinensis DD
Genus: Tursiops
 Indo-Pacific bottlenose dolphin, Tursiops aduncus DD
 Common bottlenose dolphin, Tursiops truncatus DD
Genus: Stenella
 Pantropical spotted dolphin, Stenella attenuata 
 Striped dolphin, Stenella coeruleoalba 
 Spinner dolphin, Stenella longirostris 
Genus: Delphinus
 Long-beaked common dolphin, Delphinus capensis DD
 Short-beaked common dolphin, Delphinus delphis 
Genus: Lagenodelphis
 Fraser's dolphin, Lagenodelphis hosei DD
Genus: Lagenorhynchus
 Pacific white-sided dolphin, Lagenorhynchus obliquidens 
Genus: Grampus
 Risso's dolphin, Grampus griseus DD 
Genus: Feresa
 Pygmy killer whale, Feresa attenuata DD
Genus: Peponocephala
 Melon-headed whale, Peponocephala electra 
Genus: Pseudorca
 False killer whale, Pseudorca crassidens 
Genus: Globicephala
 Short-finned pilot whale, Globicephala macrorhynchus 
Genus: Orcinus
 Orca, Orcinus orca

Order: Carnivora (carnivorans) 

There are over 260 species of carnivorans, the majority of which feed primarily on meat. They have a characteristic skull shape and dentition.
Suborder: Feliformia
Family: Felidae (cats)
Subfamily: Felinae
Genus: Prionailurus
 Leopard cat, P. bengalensis 
Family: Viverridae (civets, genets etc.)
Subfamily: Paradoxurinae
Genus: Paguma
 Masked palm civet, P. larvata 
Subfamily: Viverrinae
Genus: Viverricula
 Small Indian civet, V. indica 
Family: Herpestidae (mongooses)
Genus: Urva
 Crab-eating mongoose, U. urva 
Suborder: Caniformia
Family: Ursidae (bears)
Genus: Ursus
 Asiatic black bear, U. thibetanus 
 Formosan black bear, U. t. formosanus 
Family: Mustelidae (mustelids)
Genus: Aonyx
 Asian small-clawed otter, A. cinereus 
Genus: Lutra
 European otter, L. lutra 
Genus: Martes
 Yellow-throated marten, M. flavigula 
Genus: Melogale
 Formosan ferret-badger, M. subaurantiaca 
Genus: Mustela
 Least weasel, M. nivalis 
 Siberian weasel, M. sibirica

Order: Artiodactyla (even-toed ungulates) 

The even-toed ungulates are ungulates whose weight is borne about equally by the third and fourth toes, rather than mostly or entirely by the third as in perissodactyls. There are about 220 artiodactyl species, including many that are of great economic importance to humans.

Family: Suidae (pigs)
Subfamily: Suinae
Genus: Sus
 Wild boar, S. scrofa 
Family: Cervidae (deer)
Subfamily: Cervinae
Genus: Cervus
 Sika deer, C. nippon 
 Formosan sika deer, C. n. taiouanus
Genus: Rusa
 Sambar deer, R. unicolor 
Subfamily: Muntiacinae
Genus: Muntiacus
 Reeves's muntjac, M. reevesi 
Family: Bovidae (cattle, antelope, sheep, goats)
Subfamily: Caprinae
Genus: Nemorhaedus
 Taiwan serow, N. swinhoei

Extirpated 
The following species are locally extinct in the country:
Dugong, Dugong dugon
Water deer, Hydropotes inermis
Formosan clouded leopard, Neofelis nebulosa

See also
List of chordate orders
Lists of mammals by region
List of prehistoric mammals
List of mammals described in the 2000s

Notes

References
 

 
Mammals
Taiwan
Taiwan